Night Wave is the second studio album by Los Angeles based Electrohop group Hyper Crush. The album was released on the iTunes Store on February 7, 2012. The album was released on Hyper Crush's label Night Wave Records after leaving their previous label Universal Motown because they "really didn’t see eye to eye with them for a long time." The album consists of 11 songs, 4 of which were previously released as singles. Save for three of the songs which were co-written and co-produced, the entire album was written and produced by Hyper Crush.

Promotion 
A trailer created by Cassidy Sanders for the album was released January 17, 2012 featuring "What Goes Up". To generate hype and boost their pre-order numbers, free physical copies of the album were sent to fans who pre-ordered the album. Another promotional giveaway occurred during their official album release party, which was held at The Roxy Theatre on February 3, 2012. The CD was later available to buy on their website. They also released videos for "WTF", "Chead" and "Bad Boyz".

Singles 
"Fingers Up," "Flip The Switch," "Maniac," and their music videos were all released for free during their summer-long series titled "Free Song Friday. The single for "Werk Me" was released on October 17, 2011, and its video premiered on the front page of Vevo months later on January 10, 2012.

Track listing 
This is the official track list, however on the CD, "WTF" is track 7 and "What Goes Up" is track 6 despite being listed otherwise on the back cover.

References 

2012 albums